This is a list of the regional county municipalities (RCM or MRC) and equivalent territories (TE) in the province of Quebec, Canada. They are given along with their geographical codes as specified by the Ministry of Municipal Affairs, Regions and Land Occupancy, and the administrative regions to which they belong.

RCMs are county-like units of government at the supralocal level. However, not all municipalities belong to an RCM. In order to use RCMs for statistical purposes, some municipalities (mostly Indian reserves) are viewed as belonging to RCMs they do not belong to legally. The possibly enlarged RCMs are called municipalités régionales de comté géographiques (MRCG) as opposed to the legal ones known as municipalités régionales de comté juridiques (MRCJ). The remaining municipalities are grouped into territories equivalent to an RCM (French: territoires équivalents à une MRC) or TEs, which are also considered MRCGs. This way, MRCGs cover the entire territory of Quebec and do not overlap.

There are 87 RCMs and 17 TEs in Quebec, for a total of 104 MRCGs. 14 of the TEs correspond exactly (or very nearly correspond) to cities or urban agglomerations. The only 3 exceptional cases are the TEs of Jamésie, Kativik and Eeyou Istchee. These TEs lie in Northern Quebec and cover large areas with many, mostly small, municipalities.

Because of cooperation between the Institut de la statistique du Québec and Statistics Canada, RCMs and TEs correspond neatly to census divisions in most cases. See the section "Use as census divisions" below.

For further details, see Regional county municipality.

Lists

Municipalities with populations of at least 5,000 as of the 2006 Census are listed, with their legal status in parentheses. Those with populations over 20,000 are highlighted.

The seat of the regional county municipality (RCM) is indicated with an asterisk (*). If its population is less than 5,000, then it appears in italics.

The information concerning (legal) RCMs, including their seats, is taken from the database of municipalities of the Ministère des Affaires municipales et régionales. Information concerning geographical RCMs is taken from a list published by the Ministère de la Faune et des Ressources naturelles. Relevant definitions can be obtained from the website of the Institut de la Statistique du Québec.

East Québec

Quebec City Area

Eastern Townships

Montérégie

Montréal and Laval

Central Québec

West Québec

Northern Québec

Use as census divisions

Statistics Canada divides Quebec into 98 census divisions that are mostly coextensive with Quebec's regional county municipalities and equivalent territories.

93 of these census divisions correspond to a single regional county municipality or equivalent territory in the list above. In these cases the census division and the corresponding RCM or TE share a single two-digit geographical code, except for Lévis, whose code is 251.

The census divisions that are an exception to this are shown below, with geographical codes in parentheses:

 The CD of Francheville (37) consists of the TE of Trois-Rivières (371) and the RCM of Les Chenaux (372). These two divisions formerly constituted the single RCM of Francheville, which was dissolved in 2002.
 The CD of Le Saguenay-et-son-Fjord (94) consists of the TE of Saguenay (941) and the RCM of Le Fjord-du-Saguenay (942). Le Fjord-du-Saguenay formerly included the smaller cities which were amalgamated to create the new city of Saguenay in 2002.
 The CD of Sept-Rivières—Caniapiscau (97) consists of the RCMs of Sept-Rivières (971) and Caniapiscau (972).
 The CD of Minganie–Le Golfe-du-Saint-Laurent (98) consists of the RCMs of Minganie (981) and Le Golfe-du-Saint-Laurent (982). The latter superseded Basse-Côte-Nord in 2010; Basse-Côte-Nord itself was part of Minganie until 2002.
 The CD of Nord-du-Québec (99) is coextensive with the administrative region of Nord-du-Québec and consists of the TEs of Jamésie (991), Kativik (992) and Eeyou Istchee (993).

Former regional county municipalities
The following former regional county municipalities all ceased to exist in conjunction with changes introduced in the 2000–2006 municipal reorganization in Quebec:
 Champlain Regional County Municipality
 Desjardins Regional County Municipality
 Francheville Regional County Municipality
 La Région-Sherbrookoise Regional County Municipality
 Laval Regional County Municipality
 Le Centre-de-la-Mauricie Regional County Municipality
 Le Haut-Saint-Maurice Regional County Municipality
 Les Chutes-de-la-Chaudière Regional County Municipality
 Les Îles-de-la-Madeleine Regional County Municipality
 Mirabel Regional County Municipality
 Rouyn-Noranda Regional County Municipality

Renamed regional county municipalities 
 La Haute-Gaspésie Regional County Municipality was formerly known as Denis-Riverin RCM.
 The former La Région-Sherbrookoise Regional County Municipality was earlier known as Sherbrooke RCM.
 La Vallée-de-l'Or Regional County Municipality was formerly known as Vallée-de-l'Or RCM.
 Le Rocher-Percé Regional County Municipality was formerly known as Pabok RCM.
 Les Appalaches Regional County Municipality was formerly known as L'Amiante RCM.
 Les Sources Regional County Municipality was formerly known as Asbestos RCM, and prior to that as  L'Or-Blanc RCM.
 Marguerite-D'Youville Regional County Municipality was formerly known as Lajemmerais RCM.
 Pierre-De Saurel Regional County Municipality was formerly known as Le Bas-Richelieu RCM.
 Beauce-Centre Regional County Municipality was formerly known as Robert-Cliche RCM.

See also
Administrative divisions of Quebec
Local government in Quebec
Regions of Quebec
List of communities in Quebec
Census geographic units of Canada
List of census divisions of Quebec
List of historic counties of Quebec

Notes

References
 Database of the Geographical code of Quebec

Local government in Quebec
 
Regional County Municipalities
Regional county municipalities in Quebec